Jack and Jill is a 2011 American comedy film directed by Dennis Dugan from a script by Steve Koren and Adam Sandler. The film was released on November 11, 2011, by Columbia Pictures and grossed $149 million against its $79 million budget.

Jack and Jill stars Sandler in a dual role as twin siblings Jack and Jill Sadelstein, the former a Los Angeles advertising executive being visited for Thanksgiving by the latter from the Bronx. Jack is constantly annoyed by his sister and is horrified to learn that Jill plans to stay after Hanukkah due to an open-ended plane ticket. However, when Jack is demanded by an agency for Dunkin' Donuts to get Al Pacino (as himself) for a commercial, Pacino becomes affectionate for Jill, making Jack try to convince her to date the actor despite her disinterest in him. Other stars include Katie Holmes as Jack's wife and Eugenio Derbez as another love interest for Jill.

Jack and Jill was panned by critics and audiences, although Pacino's performance received some praise. Some have since considered this to be one of the worst films ever made. At the 32nd Golden Raspberry Awards, the film was nominated for a record of 12 Razzies in all ten categories. It became the first film to sweep the Razzies, winning in each category including Worst Picture, Worst Director, Worst Actor, Worst Actress, and Worst Screenplay.

The film features the final film performance of Regis Philbin.

Plot

Jack Sadelstein is a successful Los Angeles advertising executive. He and his wife Erin have a daughter, Sofia. Also living with them is Gary, a Hindu boy who they adopted at birth, and who has a habit of compulsively taping various objects to his own body. Jack wants counseling for Gary to break the boy's addiction, but Erin won't hear of this; she views Gary's behavior as the very thing which makes him unique. 

Jack's unemployed twin sister Jill has been living alone in their working-class New York City neighborhood, since the death of their mother. She visits Jack for Thanksgiving, with plans to stay until after Hanukkah, much to Jack's horror. Jill, who has an open-ended plane ticket, annoys her brother at Thanksgiving dinner, where she also embarrasses a homeless guest, as well as Erin's parents. 

The Sadelstein twins attend a celebration given in their honor by the staff of Jack's advertising company. Jill disgraces herself, her brother, and his colleagues, until she is asked to leave her own party. A day later, Jill's obnoxious conduct gets Jack and his family banned from their local movie theater.

Jill goes through a list she has compiled of things to do in Southern California: being a contestant on The Price is Right; going horseback riding (she breaks the horse's back just by sitting on it), and touring a studio. Deciding that Jill needs a partner, Jack and the kids teach her how to use an online dating site. However, being Jill, she fails miserably in her efforts to find a boyfriend. One guy, calling himself "Funbucket", meets Jill at a swanky restaurant but sneaks out after only a few minutes with her.
Jack's agency client, meanwhile, wants him to get actor Al Pacino to appear in a Dunkin' Donuts commercial, thus promoting a new coffee called the "Dunkaccino." Jack takes Jill to a Lakers game with Pacino in attendance. Pacino ignores Jack but is infatuated with Jill; it turns out Pacino and Jill grew up on the same street in NYC. Pacino gives Jill his phone number and invites her to his home; yet, for some reason (being Jill), she has no interest in him whatsoever and promptly departs. 

Jack's Mexican gardener Felipe, also smitten with Jill, takes her to meet his family at their annual fiesta. There she tries Mexican food for the first time, and comes down with severe diarrhea, which makes her even more difficult to live with than usual.

Pacino refuses to do the Dunkaccino commercial unless Jack gets him another date with Jill; this forces Jack to invite Jill on a cruise which he was planning just for his immediate family. Jill insists on bringing her pet cockatoo Poopsie along for the trip, despite the cruise line's strict "No Pets" policy. Throughout the voyage, Jill and Poopsie continue to irritate and offend everybody except Sofia, Gary, and their mom.
When Jill keeps refusing to give Pacino another chance with her, Jack disguises himself as his sister and meets the actor. Jill (hearing Pacino's voice in the background of a phone call with her brother) learns she was invited just so Pacino would do the commercial. Dejected, she returns home to NYC. Feeling guilty, Jack follows her along with Erin and the kids.

Jill arrives back in the Bronx on New Year's Eve, only to discover that the bank has taken away her mother's house; this is because Jill kept throwing away numerous bills which she thought were junk mail. The now-homeless Jill encounters a group of former schoolmates, led by class bully Monica, at a restaurant. Jack, Erin, and their kids show up. The twin siblings reconcile by conversing in their made-up twin language. When Monica attacks Erin, she is cold-cocked by Jill. Pacino arrives in character as Don Quixote, who he is currently portraying in a Broadway production of Man of La Mancha. He tells Jill that while he has feelings for her, there is another man more worthy of her than himself. She goes home to find Felipe and his children, where they begin a relationship. The television commercial is made, with Pacino starring and singing a rap song, and he disapproves of it.

Cast

The film also features cameos from Johnny Depp, Regis Philbin, Dan Patrick, Shaquille O'Neal, Drew Carey, John McEnroe, Christie Brinkley, Bill Romanowski, Michael Irvin, Jared Fogle, Billy Blanks, Vince Offer and Caitlyn Jenner (the latter prior to her transition, as Bruce Jenner) as themselves.

Reception

Box office
The film opened in 3,438 theaters at #2 with $25,003,575, behind Immortals, which debuted in the top spot with $32,206,425. The film closed on February 26, 2012, with a total gross of $74,158,157 in North America. It also made $75,515,631 in other territories, for a total worldwide gross of $149,673,788 against its $79 million budget.

Critical response 
Unusually, Jack and Jill was screened for critics in Ireland but not in the United Kingdom. It was panned by reviewers. On Rotten Tomatoes, the film has an approval rating of 3% based on 116 reviews, with an average rating of 2.90/10. The website's critical consensus reads, "Although it features an inexplicably committed performance from Al Pacino, Jack and Jill is impossible to recommend on any level whatsoever." On Metacritic, the film has a weighted average score of 23 out of 100, based on 26 critics, indicating "generally unfavorable reviews". Audiences polled by CinemaScore gave the film an average grade of "B" on an A+ to F scale. Five months before release and the film getting extremely poor reception, the film was mocked on South Park during the episode "You're Getting Old" when Stan and his friends go to the movie theater to watch X-Men: First Class, a trailer depicts Adam Sandler's characters Jack and Jill as feces and in Robot Chicken during Season 6 during the segment "Twist Endings" depicting Jill being actually Jack and that the real Jill died when she was young. On the day of the premiere, comedians such as Jake Fogelnest launched a parody promotional account on Twitter, @JackNJillMovie, bashing the film; garnering hundreds of followers and its posts retweeted by figures such as Aziz Ansari, Paul Scheer, and Alan Sepinwall, it was taken down by Twitter that evening due to a complaint from a Sony executive.

Critics from The Daily Beast, The Austin Chronicle, and Time declare Jack and Jill to be the worst Sandler film.

Reviews noted issues in other Sandler films were present and even worsened in Jack and Jill. Common criticisms were targeted towards the crude humor, product placement, celebrity cameos, and a sentimental ending that contradicted the film's mostly mean-spirited tone.

The A.V. Clubs Scott Tobias went after Sandler's lack of passion, describing most scenes as the actor "waiting around for somebody to feed him a line". Time contributor Mary Pols described a joke about Jack's obsessed fear of anti-semitism as a punch line with no joke.

Peter Travers of Rolling Stone also argued, "Al Pacino said something great. After he looks at himself in the commercial, he says, 'Burn this! Nobody must ever see this!' That's my review of Jack and Jill." Andrew Barker of Variety said that the film's "general stupidity, careless direction and reliance on a single-joke premise that was never really funny to begin with are only the most obvious of its problems."

Pacino's performance was positively received, and some critics noted it to be one of the film's best parts, although his presence was questioned. The London Evening Standard found the actor (playing himself) to be "slumming" it in providing Jill one of the film's few funny parts.

Despite generally scathing reviews, the film did receive some positive reception. Mick LaSalle of the San Francisco Chronicle stated that while he found the character Jill annoying, "almost everything else in this comedy succeeds. The central situation...has comic energy...[the film has] successful bits and big moments of satisfying comedy." Tom Russo of The Boston Globe gave the film two and a half out of a possible four stars, writing "What's more genuinely wacky is what a kick this movie can sometimes be, completely in spite of its big, flat stunt." Armond White of CityArts praised the film's "comic introspection," writing that "Sandler's comedies are not 'dumb fun,' maybe that's why they're not in critics' favor."

Jack and Jill was in the top five of numerous critics' lists of the worst films of 2011, ranking number one on those of Peoples Alynda Wheat, the Miami Heralds Rene Rodriguez, Times Mary Pols, The A.V. Club staff, and the Sioux City Journals Bruce Miller. For Rolling Stone, Peter Travers ranked it the year's second worst film and tied Sandler's performance with Anne Hathaway in One Day for his recognition of worst actor of the year. In later years, it has been called one of the worst films of all-time by the Evening Standard and Rotten Tomatoes, as well as one of the worst Sandler films by Variety.

Accolades 

At the 32nd Golden Raspberry Awards, Jack and Jill won all 10 categories, a first in the 32-year history of the annual parody event: Worst Picture (for Sandler, Jack Giarraputo, and Todd Garner), Worst Actor and Worst Actress (for Sandler), Worst Supporting Actor (for Swardson and Pacino, which the latter won), Worst Supporting Actress (for Holmes and Spade in drag, which the latter won), Worst Director (for Dugan), Worst Screenplay (for Sandler, Ben Zook, and Steve Koren), Worst Screen Couple (for Sandler and either Pacino, Holmes or Sandler), Worst Ensemble and Worst Prequel, Remake, Rip-off or Sequel.

Sandler also set another Razzie record by garnering 12 nominations in total, breaking Eddie Murphy's 2008 five-nomination record for the most garnered by one individual in a single ceremony (for Norbit). In addition to Jack and Jill, he was also nominated for Worst Picture, Worst Prequel, Remake, Rip-Off, or Sequel, and Worst Screenplay nominations for Bucky Larson: Born to Be a Star; and two Worst Screen Couple awards for Just Go with It. Razzie founder John J. B. Wilson called "almost karmic for someone to have made that much razz-able stuff in one year", suggesting the actor "angered someone really powerful, I would say".

References

External links

 
 
 Jack and Jill at the TCM Movie Database
 

2011 films
2011 comedy films
American comedy films
American satirical films
Cross-dressing in American films
Cultural depictions of actors
2010s English-language films
Films about dysfunctional families
Films about twins
Films directed by Dennis Dugan
Films set in Los Angeles
Films set on ships
Films shot in Los Angeles
Films with screenplays by Adam Sandler
Golden Raspberry Award winning films
Happy Madison Productions films
Thanksgiving in films
Columbia Pictures films
Films produced by Adam Sandler
Fictional twins
Films scored by Rupert Gregson-Williams
Twins in fiction
2010s American films
English-language comedy films